1 Delphini (1 Del) is the Flamsteed designation for a close binary star in the equatorial constellation Delphinus. With  a combined apparent magnitude of 6.08,  it  is barely visible to the naked eye, even under ideal conditions. Parallax measurements put the components at a distance 703 and 780 light years respectively.

1 Del consists of three components. The brightest of them has a magnitude of 6.1; a companion located around 0.9 arcseconds from the primary has an apparent magnitude of 8.1; and a third star, located much farther away at around 17 arcseconds from component A, is the faintest with a magnitude of around 14 and is an unrelated background object. 

The entire system has a stellar classification of A1: III sh, indicating that it is a white giant + a shell star. However, there is some uncertainty about the temperature class. When resolved, the secondary has a class of B9. 1 Del A has 3 times the mass of the Sun and an effective temperature of 10,651 K, giving it a bluish white glow. It is estimated to be almost 250 million years old and has a solar metallicity. Both components spin rapidly, with projected rotational velocities of 217 and 370 km/s respectively. As for the peculiarities, the shell star is a primary component; the spectrum of the secondary shows broad absorption lines.

Due to the stability of the emission lines data from 1 Delphini has been used for developing models of shell stars and Be stars.

References

Further reading

Delphini, 01
Delphinus (constellation)
Triple stars
101160
7836
195325
Durchmusterung objects
Shell stars
A-type giants
Emission-line stars